9 Corps, 9th Corps, Ninth Corps, or IX Corps may refer to:

France
 9th Army Corps (France)
 IX Corps (Grande Armée), a unit of the Imperial French Army during the Napoleonic Wars

Germany
 IX Corps (German Empire), a unit of the Imperial German Army prior to and during World War I
 IX Reserve Corps (German Empire), a unit of the Imperial German Army during World War
 IX Army Corps (Wehrmacht), a unit in World War II
 IX SS Mountain Corps, a unit in World War II

Other countries
 IX Corps (India)
 IX Corps (Ottoman Empire)
 IX Corps (United Kingdom)
 IX Corps (Union Army)
 IX Corps (United States)
 9th Corps (Yugoslav Partisans)

See also
List of military corps by number